The Merchants Lacrosse Club is a box lacrosse team from Oshawa, Ontario. The Merchants play in the Ontario Series Lacrosse (OSL) league (formerly known as Senior "B"). The OSL is the counterpart of the Quebec Senior Lacrosse League, Rocky Mountain Lacrosse League & West Coast Senior Lacrosse Association.

Championships 

Presidents Cup Canadian Champions (0)

Ontario Series Champions (2)

Season-by-season results

Notable alumni 
Steve Taylor
Mike Fryer
Steve McCarthy
Jaret Bilich
Mike Bilich
Paul St. John
Frank Littlejohn
Paul Stewart
Jonas Derks
Joel Johnson
Brad Reed
John Chessborough
Duke McNutt
Ryan Degerdon
Kutis Wager
Dan Ransom
Matt Spanger

Team records 

Lacrosse teams in Ontario
Sport in Oshawa
Lacrosse clubs established in 2000
2000 establishments in Ontario